Ju-jitsu competition at the 2016 Asian Beach Games was held in Danang, Vietnam from 25 to 27 September 2016 at Bien Dong Park.

Medalists

Duo show

Men's ne-waza

Women's ne-waza

Medal table

Results

Duo show

Men
26 September

Women
25 September

Mixed
27 September

Men's ne-waza

56 kg
26 September

62 kg
25 September

69 kg
25 September

77 kg
26 September

85 kg
25 September

94 kg
25 September

+94 kg
25 September

Open
27 September

Women's ne-waza

45 kg
25 September

49 kg
25 September

55 kg
26 September

62 kg
26 September

70 kg
26 September

+70 kg
26 September

Open
27 September

References

External links 
 

2016 Asian Beach Games events